Ponerorchis secundiflora (synonym Neottianthe secundiflora) is a species of plant in the family Orchidaceae. It is native from the Himalayas to China.

Taxonomy
The species was described by Joseph Dalton Hooker in 1890, under the name "Habenaria secundiflora". However, this name had already been used for a different species in 1881, so was illegitimate. The species was first legitimately named in 1898 by Friedrich Kraenzlin as Peristylus secundiflorus. It was later transferred to Gymnadenia and then to Neottianthe. A molecular phylogenetic study in 2014 found that species of Neottianthe, Amitostigma and Ponerorchis were mixed together in a single clade, making none of the three genera monophyletic as then circumscribed. Neottianthe and Amitostigma were subsumed into Ponerorchis, with this species becoming Ponerorchis secundiflora.

Distribution
Ponerorchis secundiflora is native to the Himalayas, including Tibet, Nepal and the Assam region. Its range extends to Myanmar and south-central China (west Sichuan and north-west Yunnan).

References

secundiflora
Plants described in 1898
Flora of Assam (region)
Flora of East Himalaya
Flora of Myanmar
Flora of Nepal
Flora of South-Central China
Flora of Tibet
Flora of West Himalaya